Halina Tyryk (born 30 March 1980) is a Ukrainian gymnast. She finished twenty-second in the all around at the 2000 Summer Olympics.

See also 
 List of Olympic female artistic gymnasts for Ukraine

References

External links
 

1980 births
Living people
Ukrainian female artistic gymnasts
Olympic gymnasts of Ukraine
Gymnasts at the 2000 Summer Olympics
Sportspeople from Lviv
21st-century Ukrainian women